Nakhon Ratchasima Airport , is a domestic airport serving Nakhon Ratchasima, Thailand.

Nakhon Ratchasima airport is in Amphoe Chaloem Phra Kiat, approximately 26 kilometers east of the city of Nakhon Ratchasima.

Airlines and destinations

References

External links
 

Buildings and structures in Nakhon Ratchasima province
Airports in Thailand
Airports established in 1997